Lamar Edward Butler, Jr. (born December 21, 1983) is an American former basketball player and current boys basketball coach. He was a starting guard for the Patriots of George Mason University during the Patriots' surprising run to the Final Four.  Lamar is currently an assistant coach for the Paul VI boys basketball team located in Chantilly, VA.

College career

During George Mason's captivating run through the NCAA tournament, Butler became a symbol of Cinderella and the tournament collectively with his tenacious heart and infectious smile and was featured on the cover of the March 27, 2006 edition of Sports Illustrated magazine.  Following GMU's stunning 86–84 overtime victory against the top-seeded UConn Huskies in the Washington D.C. Regional Final, Butler was named the region's Most Valuable Player.  He scored 13 points against Michigan State in the first round, 18 points against North Carolina in the second round, 14 points against Wichita State in the Sweet Sixteen, and 19 points against UConn in the Elite Eight.

After the regional final, Butler and his father were in tears as they hugged at length on the court.  It hearkened memories of Butler's recruiting by GMU, during which he brashly predicted to Coach Jim Larranaga that he would lead the Patriots to the Final Four.

"I think I was joking when I said that," Butler said. "I started dreaming when I got to college. It shows you anything can happen."

Butler and the Patriots then headed to Indianapolis, where they faced the Florida Gators, led by Minnesota Regional MVP Joakim Noah. To the dismay of many across the country rooting for the team leading one of the greatest Cinderella stories in sports history, George Mason was defeated by Florida in the Final Four 73–58 on Saturday, April 1, 2006. In his final game as an NCAA athlete, Butler played 36 minutes where he scored 8 points (4 of 7 FGs, 0 of 2 3PTs) had 4 rebounds, and 1 assist.  He will remain etched in NCAA basketball lore for the role he played in George Mason's run.

He averaged 12.0 points, 2.5 rebounds, and 2.2 assists per game during the 2005–2006 season.

Professional career

Since graduating, Butler was offered to join the summer league for the Washington Wizards only to have the deal revoked. In 2007, he played with BK Prostejov in the Czech Republic for $8,000 a month.

During the 2008–09 season, Lamar played 23 games for the NBA Development League's Colorado 14ers where he averaged 15 minutes, 6 points and 2 assists per game.

On March 5, 2009 he was waived by Colorado and a few days later picked up by the Reno Bighorns.

See also
George Mason Patriots men's basketball
2005-06 George Mason Patriots men's basketball season
2004-05 George Mason Patriots men's basketball team

References

External links
Official Mason bio
Video Interview with Mason UnLtd on Sept. 5, 2006
A Video Message from Lamar Butler to all the fans
March 27, 2006 Sports Illustrated

1983 births
Living people
African-American basketball players
American expatriate basketball people in the Czech Republic
American expatriate basketball people in Turkey
Basketball players from Maryland
Colorado 14ers players
George Mason Patriots men's basketball players
Guards (basketball)
People from Fort Washington, Maryland
Reno Bighorns players
Tofaş S.K. players
American men's basketball players
21st-century African-American sportspeople
20th-century African-American people